The order Microconchida is a group of small, spirally-coiled, encrusting fossil "worm" tubes from the class Tentaculita found from the Upper Ordovician to the Middle Jurassic (Bathonian) around the world. They have lamellar calcitic shells, usually with pseudopunctae or punctae and a bulb-like origin. Many were long misidentified as the polychaete annelid Spirorbis until studies of shell microstructure and formation showed significant differences. All pre-Cretaceous "Spirorbis" fossils are now known to be microconchids. Their classification at the phylum level is still debated. Most likely they are some form of lophophorate, a group which includes phoronids, bryozoans and brachiopods. Microconchids may be closely related to the other encrusting tentaculitoid tubeworms, such as Anticalyptraea, trypanoporids and cornulitids.

References

 Wilson, M.A., Yancey, T.E. and Vinn, O. 2011. "A new microconchid tubeworm from the Lower Permian (Artinskian) of central Texas, USA". Acta Palaeontologica Polonica 56:785-791 .
 Zaton, M., Wilson, M.A. and Vinn, O. 2012. "Redescription and neotype designation of the Middle Devonian microconchid (Tentaculita) species ‘Spirorbis’ angulatus Hall, 1861". Journal of Paleontology 86:417-424.

Tentaculita
Late Ordovician first appearances
Middle Jurassic extinctions
Prehistoric animal orders